Henry "Harry" Donovan (born September 10, 1926) is an American former professional basketball player. Donovan was selected in the second round in the 1949 BAA draft by the New York Knicks. He played for the Knicks in 1949–50, then spent two seasons playing in the American Basketball League. Donovan was a two-time all-league selection while he played for the Lancaster Rockets of the Eastern Professional Basketball League (EPBL) from 1951 to 1953.

References

External links
 Stats @ Basketball-reference.com

1926 births
Possibly living people
American Basketball League (1925–1955) players
American men's basketball players
Basketball players from New Jersey
Guards (basketball)
Muhlenberg Mules men's basketball players
New York Knicks draft picks
New York Knicks players
Sportspeople from Union City, New Jersey
Union Hill High School alumni
Wilkes-Barre Barons players